The 1973 Harlow District Council election, on 7 June 1973, was the first election to the newly created Harlow District Council. This was on the same day as other local elections.  The Local Government Act 1972 stipulated that the elected members were to shadow and eventually take over from the predecessor corporation on 1 April 1974. The election resulted in Labour gaining control of the council.

Election result

Ward results

Brays Grove (3 seats)

Great Parndon (2 seats)

Hare Street and Town Centre (3 seats)

Kingsmoor (2 seats)

Latton Bush (3 seats)

Little Parndon (3 seats)

Mark Hall North (2 seats)

Mark Hall South (4 seats)

Netteswell (5 seats)

Old Harlow (3 seats)

Passmores (3 seats)

Potter Street (3 seats)

Stewards (3 seats)

Tye Green (3 seats)

References

1973
1973 English local elections
1970s in Essex